The Hidden Houses are a pair of historic houses located in Vancouver, Washington. They are listed on the National Register of Historic Places.

The historic Lowell M. Hidden and W. Foster Hidden houses have helped shaped the face of Vancouver, Washington. The Hidden family has been present in Vancouver since the 1860s with Lowell Mason Hidden being the first to arrive from New England in 1864.

In 1871, Lowell M. Hidden started the Hidden Brick Company. It's estimated that 60 million bricks were made there and built many of the historic buildings in downtown Vancouver including the Mother Josephs Providence Academy in 1873, and the St James Cathedral in 1885.

Lowell M. Hidden died in 1923 and his sons W. Foster and Oliver Hidden took over the brick company. The partnership ended in 1940 when Oliver Hidden died, leaving the company to W. Foster. Today, the Brick company is owned by Robert Hidden, W. Fosters son, who took over the business after W. Foster died in 1963.

See also
 National Register of Historic Places listings in Clark County, Washington

References

Buildings and structures in Vancouver, Washington
Colonial Revival architecture in Washington (state)
Houses completed in 1884
Houses in Clark County, Washington
Houses on the National Register of Historic Places in Washington (state)
National Register of Historic Places in Clark County, Washington
Queen Anne architecture in Washington (state)